Cornelia Catangă (9 March 1958 – 26 March 2021) was a Romanian lăutar musician of Roma origin.

Biography
In 1979, she sang for a short time with Romica Puceanu. In 1985 she had her first show at the Polyvalent Hall. Since 1986 she toured abroad and released her first LP in 1989, accompanied by the Ion Onoriu's orchestra. She sang together with her husband Aurel Pădureanu.

Catangă died on 26 March 2021, aged 63, from COVID-19 in Bucharest during the COVID-19 pandemic in Romania. She was buried on 27 March 2021, in the Ghencea Cemetery.

References

 

People from Buzău County
1958 births
2021 deaths
Lăutari and lăutărească music
Deaths from the COVID-19 pandemic in Romania
20th-century Romanian women singers
20th-century Romanian singers
21st-century Romanian women singers
21st-century Romanian singers
Romanian Romani people
Burials at Ghencea Cemetery